Cradick may refer to:

 Julian Cradick (born 1947), English former cricketer
 Peter David Cradick (1959–2013), professionally known as Kidd Kraddick, American radio host and television personality
 Cradick Corner, Indiana, United States, an unincorporated community

See also
 Craddick (disambiguation)
 Cradock (disambiguation)
 Craddock (disambiguation)